Currie Rugby Football Club are an Edinburgh-based rugby union club in the Scottish Rugby Union, they currently play in the Scottish Premiership.  Despite the name, "Currie" RFC is actually based in the neighbouring suburb of Balerno, and they play at Malleny Park.

Currently the club run three senior sides, along with the Colts and youth rugby ages group teams.

History

The foundation of the club was initially started by six individuals; Bob Kirkwood, Jack Hogg, Roger Mclaren, Tom Chandler, David Bisset & Alex Galbraith . Having discussed the formation of a team in a local bar called the Weavers Knowe. From these discussions followed the idea to form a full rugby club in the local area.

The 'six' were joined by Gordon Stewart, and given the necessary backing and, more importantly, use of the facilities at Currie High School, by the Headmaster, Ronnie Paul. Together the group sent out posters and leaflets around the Currie, Balerno and Juniper Green area calling on all interested to attend an open meeting at Curriehill School in April 1970 to 'discuss the formation of a local Rugby Club'. On the given evening 35 individuals attended and it was agreed to form a club to be called Currie Rugby Football Club, with the aim of promoting and developing the game of rugby within the area for the benefit of the sport and the community. The club officially formed in April 1970 and in October that year a team was fielded to play Gala Wanderers at Gala. For the very first game the club played in jerseys borrowed from Boroughmuir. By January 1971 they were fielding two XVs and the following season a third occasionally appeared.

In the season 1973–74 the SRU decided to formalise the then unofficial championship and bring in a league structure, which gave Currie the entry to Edinburgh District League, Division II. Progress and promotion followed in 1976–77. The club was promoted from the District League into the National League during the 1979–80 season, where the Club would go undefeated and scored over 1,000 points.

Successive promotion to Division 6 came the next year and following league reconstruction the club was in Division 5 by the start of the 1981–82 season. The rise of the club would continue with them winning promotion in 1982–83, 1985–86 and 1986–87 to arrive in Division 2 of the National League.

In 1989–90 Currie completed a remarkable rise through the leagues by finishing second in Division 2 and were promoted to Division 1 alongside Edinburgh Wanders. The club remained in the top division of Scottish Rugby until 1995 where league reconstruction saw them along with five other teams demoted into the Division 2. However, the club would bounce back the following year to win Division 2 outright regained promotion back to Division I, alongside Jed-Forest. The club have remained in the top tier of the National League ever since.

In 2006–07 season Currie secured their first Division 1 championship with victory over Heriots at Goldenacre, beating Glasgow Hawks to the league title. It completed the fasted ever journey from club formation to League success in the history of Scottish Rugby. They would repeat this in 2009–10 beating Ayr to the title.

In 2017, they rebranded as the Currie Chieftains.

Sevens

The club run the Currie Sevens tournament. The teams play for the Balerno Bowl.

Honours

 Currie Sevens
 Champions (2): 1987, 1988
 Scottish Premiership
 Champions (2): 2006–07,  2009–10
 Scottish Cup
 Runners-Up: (1) 2005-06
 Division 2
 Champions (1): 1995–96
 Division 3
 Champions (1): 1986–87
 Division 4
 Champions (1): 1985–86
 Division 7
 Champions (1): 1980–81
 E.D.U. Division 1
 Champions (1): 1979–80
 E.D.U. Division 2
 Champions (1): 1976–77
 Tennents Shield
 Champions (1): 1996
 Glasgow City Sevens
 Champions (1): 2001
 Peebles Sevens
 Champions (1): 1991
 Walkerburn Sevens
 Champions (3): 1991, 1994, 1995
 Lochaber Sevens
 Champions (1): 1985
 Forrester Sevens
 Champions (1): 1981
 Holy Cross Sevens
 Champions (1): 1986
 Edinburgh Northern Sevens
 Champions (4): 1979, 1982, 2014, 2016
 Edinburgh District Sevens
 Champions (1): 1982

Notable former players
Dougie Fife
Matt Scott
Ben Cairns
Graham Ellis
Blair Kinghorn

References

Currie RFC Official Website

Sports teams in Edinburgh
Scottish rugby union teams
Rugby union in Edinburgh
Rugby clubs established in 1970
1970 establishments in Scotland